Los protegidos may refer to:
 Los protegidos (Spanish TV series)
 Los protegidos (Colombian TV series)